Franklin Center is an unincorporated community and census-designated place (CDP) located in Franklin Township, in Somerset County, New Jersey, United States. As of the 2010 United States Census, the CDP's population was 4,460.

Geography
According to the United States Census Bureau, Franklin Center had a total area of 6.682 square miles (17.305 km2), including 6.579 square miles (17.040 km2) of land and 0.103 square miles (0.266 km2) of water (1.53%).

Demographics

Census 2010

References

Census-designated places in Somerset County, New Jersey
Franklin Township, Somerset County, New Jersey